The Black Ribbon Movement Myanmar was a movement of medical professions and medical students against the appointment of military officers to positions within Ministry of Health in Myanmar (Burma) in August 2015.

Background
 
Successive Burmese governments since the military took over in the 60s have transferred retired military officers into management positions in various civilian departments and army appointees across various sectors have often stifled the progress of experienced civilian staff.

Pe Thet Khin, a paediatrician and Minister for Health, was forced into retirement on 29 July 2014, and was replaced by Than Aung, a former military doctor. On reform, the department of health under Ministry of Health was split into two departments; department of public health and department of medical services, and as a result, about 330 new vacancies appeared. There had been widespread speculation within the Ministry that the minister planned to appoint 350 military officers.

On 28 and 30 July, Ministry of Health announced  that 14 officers from Ministry of Defence would be transferred to the department. Five of the appointment notices were leaked online in early October.
According to the appointments, not only military doctors but also other military officers graduated from Defence Services Academy were appointed to senior positions. These military officers will become assistant and deputy directors of Ministry of Health.
As of 2015, more than 100 ex-military officers are serving in various positions within the Ministry appointed before reforms in Myanmar.

Protests

On 10 August, doctors from Mandalay Orthopaedic Hospital  and Taungoo Hospital created a Facebook page named Black Ribbon Movement Myanmar 2015. The page reached 40000 likes within three days after creation. The campaign encouraged anyone, including medical professionals, to make a black ribbon, take a photo of themselves wearing it on their chest, and then share the image on Facebook. People who lead the campaign welcomed the military veterans to participate in the campaign announcing that this movement did not mean to fight graduates from Defence Services Academy, and was just to oppose the dictatorial decisions.

Participants were required to give exact information about themselves such as their names, majors, schools (if they’re students) and positions, departments and companies (if they’re employees) and allowed to post their photos taken individually or in groups on the social media page titled “Black Ribbon Movement Myanmar 2015”. Well-known doctors like Ye Myint Kyaw, head of department of paediatrics, and Nyunt Thein, emeritus professor of University of Medicine 1, Yangon supported the campaign. Doctors working in the ministry and civil organisations both at home and abroad as well as medical students were taking part in the campaign. Hundreds of doctors, nurses and other medical staff from various hospitals across the country rallied against the appointment donning black ribbons in photos posted online and adopting the catch cry, Say no to militarisation of Myanmar Ministry of Health.

Some organizers were planning to send a letter to the President and Parliamentary Speaker to express their opposition and discussing with some MPs to submit an urgent proposal to the parliament. Petitions against the transfers of military officers were also collected in many hospitals, and in Yangon, and Mandalay. Union of Karenni State Youth and Kayan New Land Party declared that they supported the campaign.

Governmental response
On 11 August, following the public backlash, Minister for Health conveyed a verbal message to the Myanmar Medical Association pledging that the Ministry would halt the further appointment of military staff. On 12 August, the Movement called on the Ministry to issue an official declaration and officially withdraw the recently appointed military officers. However, the Ministry refused to withdraw the military appointees or offer an official declaration.

References

External links
 BLACK RIBBON MOVEMENT MYANMAR 2015 ! at Ye Kyaw Swa 2500 blog
 Black Ribbon Movement Myanmar 2015: Say No to Militarization of Myanmar Ministry of Health at The melting pot 4 U
 SayNOtoMilitarizationofMOH - Support Campaign at Twibbon
Page
 Black Ribbon Movement Myanmar 2015 at Facebook
Group
 MoeKyaShweKoAloMashi 2015 at Facebook

Declaration of Black Ribbon Movement Myanmar Campaign Participants
 at Dawnmanhon
 at Myanmar Information Zone
 at Facebook Collection

News Collection
 at Burma National News

Protests in Myanmar
2015 in Myanmar
Ribbon symbolism
Internet-based and online protests
Internet-related activism
Black symbols
Social movements in Myanmar
2015 protests
Petitions